The Atlanta Soto Zen Center (ASZC) is a Soto Zen practice center founded in 1977 by Zenkai Taiun Michael Elliston-sensei, a dharma heir of the late Soyu Matsuoka and guiding teacher of the Mokurai Silent Thunder Order. Rev. Elliston has also received transmission in the Uchiyama lineage through  Shohaku Okumura, roshi. The Atlanta Soto Zen Center is recognized by the Soto Zen Buddhist Association and serves as the main training center for the order which has affiliate centers throughout the United States and Canada.

See also
Buddhism in the United States
Timeline of Zen Buddhism in the United States

References

Organizations based in Atlanta
Buddhism in Georgia (U.S. state)
Zen centers in the United States